Westlock County is a municipal district in central Alberta, Canada that is north of Edmonton. The county was formerly known as the Municipal District of Westlock No. 92, and was created in 1943 from the merger of five smaller municipal districts.

Geography

Physiography 
The county lies on the boundary of two of Canada's largest drainage basins.  The northern and western sectors of the county are drained by the Pembina River which flows north to meet the Athabasca River, which drains into the Arctic Ocean via the Mackenzie River. The southern and eastern sections drain into the Sturgeon River which joins the North Saskatchewan and eventually empties via the Nelson River into Hudson Bay.

A 1986 federal map shows the area as being the north-western edge of the Eastern Alberta Plains.  Specifically, the county includes parts of the Edmonton Plain (and its subdivision Westlock Plain), as well as the Tawatinaw Plain, and is bounded on the northwest by the Athabasca Valley.  The county also lies within the apen parkland: a transitional biome between the boreal forest of Canada to the north and the prairie to the south.

Communities and localities 
The following urban municipalities are surrounded by Westlock County.
Cities
none
Towns
Westlock
Villages
Clyde
Summer villages
Larkspur

The following hamlets are located within Westlock County.
Hamlets
Busby
Dapp
Fawcett
Jarvie
Nestow
Pibroch
Pickardville
Tawatinaw
Vimy

The following localities are located within Westlock County.
Localities 
Analta
Anton Lake
Arvilla
Deeney
Eastburg
Eunice
Fawn Lake
French Creek
Halach
Halcreek
Halfway Lake
Jeffrey
Linaria
Pembina Heights
Regal Park
Rossington
Shoal Creek
Sylvan Glen
Waugh

Demographics 

In the 2016 Census of Population conducted by Statistics Canada, Westlock County had a population of 7,220 living in 2,670 of its 3,009 total private dwellings, a  change from its 2011 population of 7,644.

Government 
The municipal government consists of a reeve and six other elected councillors who work with a permanent staff of 32.

Education
The county is within the Pembina Hills Public Schools, which formed in 1995 as a merger of three school districts.

See also 
List of communities in Alberta
List of municipal districts in Alberta

References

External links 

 
1943 establishments in Alberta
Municipal districts in Alberta